Alma is a 2009 Spanish computer-animated dark fantasy horror short film produced by ex-Pixar animator Rodrigo Blaas. It had received notable recognition at the Fantastic Fest awards. The word "alma" in Spanish means "Soul".

The film is about a girl named Alma who wanders into a deserted town and store.

Summary
On a cold day in a quiet city, Alma comes wandering down a quiet alleyway, encountering a wall with names of various children, she then writes her own name on it. Startled by a noise of mechanical clogs behind her, she turns cautiously around and discovers a doll on display in a shop window that looks identical to her. Curious, she tries to enter the shop only to find that the door is locked. Frustrated, Alma throws a snowball at the door. Thinking that the shop is closed, Alma begins to walk away before the door suddenly opens. Alma then enters the store.

As Alma walks in, she is presented with shelves filled with dolls. Elated, she notices the doll of herself on a table. Walking towards it, she trips over a small toy of a boy riding a bicycle. She puts the toy upright and it pedals across the floor and heads towards the exit, but the door closes before it could escape. Amused, Alma goes back to grabbing the doll, but she finds that it has disappeared.

Looking around for the doll, Alma realizes that it has moved to the top of a shelf, and she starts to climb it so that she can reach it. The moment Alma touches the doll, she finds herself looking at the shop below from the doll's perspective. Unable to move and trapped, Alma notices all of the other dolls staring at her as a different doll is raised in the shop's display window.

Proposed film adaptation
In October 2010, it was announced that DreamWorks Animation is developing an animated feature film based on Alma. Short's director Rodrigo Blaas is again set to direct the feature, with Guillermo del Toro executive producing it. In November 2011, it was reported that the studio has hired Megan Holley, a writer of Sunshine Cleaning, to write a script. Del Toro, who is also helping with the story and the design work, said in June 2012 that the film was in visual development.

References

External links
 
 
 

2009 short films
2009 films
Spanish animated short films
2000s animated short films
Animated films without speech
2000s Spanish films
Spanish dark fantasy films